Rebel Angels may refer to:
 The Rebel Angels, a 1981 novel by Robertson Davies 
 Rebel Angels: 25 Poets of the New Formalism, a 1996 poetry anthology
 Rebel Angels (novel), a 2006 fantasy novel by Libba Bray
 Rebel angels, a theme in some Jewish, Christian, and Islamic literature